Mount Benum or Mount Benom is a mountain in the state of Pahang in Malaysia.

See also
 List of Ultras of Southeast Asia
 List of mountains in Malaysia
 Jerantut
 Raub District
 Krau Wildlife Reserve
 Tenasserim Hills

References

Further reading
  A list of plant species collected was established by Henry Nicholas Ridley and is included at pp. 10–18.
 Hill, J. E. 1972. The Gunong Benom Expedition 1967. 4. New records of Malayan bats, with taxonomic notes and the description of a new Pipistrellus. Bulletin British Museum (National History) Zoology 23 (3):28-29.

External links
 "Gunung Benom, Malaysia" on Peakbagger
 "Gunung Benum" on Peakery

Benum